Ostorfer See is a lake in Nordwestmecklenburg, Mecklenburg-Vorpommern, Germany. At an elevation of 39.5 m, its surface area is 2.089 km².

Lakes of Mecklenburg-Western Pomerania